Konstantinos Kastanas (born April 6, 1993) is a Cypriot footballer who currently plays for Alki Oroklini as a defender.

External links

1994 births
Living people
Cypriot footballers
AEK Larnaca FC players
Alki Larnaca FC players
Othellos Athienou F.C. players
ASIL Lysi players
Alki Oroklini players
Association football defenders
Greek Cypriot people